Pathri is a town, near the city of Parbhani and a municipal council in Parbhani district in the Indian state of Maharashtra. It has been claimed that  Pathri is the real birthplace of Sai Baba, which has been subject to controversy. Maharashtra CM had initially granted Rs 100-crore for development of birthplace facilities at Pathri, but later dropped all references to 'Janmsthan'. Pathri Premier League (PPL) is a popular annual cricket tournament organised in the city to boost local cricketing talent.

Geography
It has an average elevation of 423 metres (1387 feet).

Demographics
 India census, Pathri  has population of 36,853 of which 19,025 are males while 17,828 are females. Pathri has Female Sex Ratio is of 937 higher than Maharashtra state average of 929. 15.1% of the population is under 6 years of age.

Literacy rate of Pathri city is 78.20% lower than state average of 82.34%. In Pathri, Male literacy is around 84.18% while female literacy rate is 71.89%.

Schedule Caste (SC) constitutes 12.04% while Schedule Tribe (ST) were 0.83% of total population in Pathri.

Tourism
Datta temple in Gunj-Khurd and Renuka Devi temple at Pedgaon hold religious importance as well. Chief Minister of Maharashtra Mr Uddhav Thakre has confirmed that Pathri is the real birthplace of Sai Baba and he has allocated Rs 1 billion for the development of Pathri. This will help to boost the economy of Pathri and Prabhani District.

Transport
Pathri is a major town on National Highway 222 which connects Kalyan to Nirmal. Pathri is located  towards west from district headquarters Parbhani. The distance between Pathri and Aurangabad is  & distance between Pathri and Nanded is 114 km (70 mi).

Administration
Pathri comes under Parbhani (Lok Sabha constituency) for Indian general elections and current member of Parliament representing this constituency is Sanjay Haribhau Jadhav of Shiv Sena.

Pathri is part of Pathri (Vidhan Sabha constituency) for assembly elections of Maharashtra. Current representative from this constituency in Maharashtra state assembly is  [Suresh Ambadasrao Warpudkar] who was Indian National Congress candidate.

References

Talukas in Maharashtra
Cities and towns in Parbhani district